Yuan Zi (739 – July 19, 818), courtesy name Deshen, formally the Duke of Huaiyang, was an official and general of the Chinese Tang Dynasty, serving briefly as chancellor during the reigns of Emperor Shunzong and Emperor Xianzong.

Background 
Yuan Zi was born in 739, during the reign of Emperor Xuanzong.  His family was from Cai Prefecture (蔡州, in modern Zhumadian, Henan).  It traced its ancestry from a clan of Han Dynasty officials, including Yuan An (who, however, was not a direct ancestor), with direct descendance through a line of officials of Han, Cao Wei, Jin Dynasty (266–420), Liu Song, Liang Dynasty, Northern Zhou, Sui Dynasty, and Tang Dynasty.  His grandfather Yuan Zhixuan served as a prefectural official, while his father Yuan Chu served as a county magistrate.

Yuan Zi was said to be studious in his youth, and as his brother-in-law Yuan Jie (元結, note different surname) was already a prefectural prefect who had a good reputation, he lived with Yuan Jie while he studied.  He interpreted the ancient works well, and Yuan Jie respected him.  He later lived as a guest in the region of Jing Prefecture (荊州, in modern Jingzhou, Hubei) and Ying Prefecture (郢州, in modern Wuhan, Hubei) and taught students.

During Emperor Dezong's reign 
Early in the Jianzhong era (780-783) of Emperor Xuanzong's great-grandson Emperor Dezong, the official Zhao Zan recommended Yuan Zi as a hermit with abilities, and he was made a Xiaoshulang, a scribe at the Palace Library.  Yuan later served on the staffs of the generals Zhang Boyi and He Shigan.  On one occasion, one of his subordinates was falsely accused of embezzlement, but Yuan was able to discover that the accusations were false and get him released.  When the deputy chief imperial censor Wei Tao heard of this, he recommended Yuan to be an imperial censor with the title Shiyushi.  Yuan later served as Gongbu Yuanwailang, a low-level official at the ministry of public works (工部, Gongbu).

In 794, Nanzhao, which had previously been a Tang vassal but which had been a Tufan vassal for some time, reestablished a relationship with Tang based on communications between the Tang general Wei Gao and its king Yimouxun, and Yimouxun offered Nanzhao's maps and local produce as tributes, and submitted the seal that Tufan's king had awarded him.  Emperor Dezong sought an appropriate emissary to visit Nanzhao, and many officials found excuses to decline due to the length of the journey, but Yuan did not decline, causing Emperor Dezong to give him much praise.  Emperor Dezong made him Cibu Langzhong, a supervisorial official at the ministry of rites (禮部, Lǐbu), and sent him to Nanzhao as an emissary.  Yuan, under Emperor Dezong's direction, bestowed a new Tang seal on Yimouxun.  After his return, he was made Jianyi Daifu, and then was made Shangshu You Cheng, one of the secretaries general of the executive bureau of government (尚書省, Shangshu Sheng) and was put in charge of selecting officials at the ministry of civil service affairs (吏部, Lìbu, note different tone than the ministry of rites).  He wrote a five-volume work, the Yunnan Ji, about his journey.

Yuan was later made the prefect of Hua Prefecture (華州, in modern Weinan, Shaanxi), as well as the defender of Tong Pass and the commander of the Zhenguo Army.  His governance was said to be simple and lenient.  When people came from other prefectures and wanted to settle in Hua Prefecture, Yuan gave them land and allowed them to settle.  The people loved him for his mercy.  However, it was also said that he did not punish people for crimes, and whenever he caught thieves, he would often release them or allow them to simply pay back what they stole.  He was later recalled to Chang'an to be a general of the imperial guards, and when he was about to leave, the people of the prefecture tried to stop him on the road to prevent him from leaving.  His successor Yang Yuling had to publicly declare, "I, Yang Yuling, would not dare to alter the policies set by Lord Yuan."  The people bowed to Yuan and allowed him to leave.

During Emperor Shunzong and Emperor Xianzong's reigns 
Emperor Dezong died in 805 and was succeeded by his severely ill son Emperor Shunzong.  Several months later, however, with Emperor Shunzong's illness, his son and crown prince Li Chun was made regent, and Yuan Zi was made Zhongshu Shilang, the deputy head of the legislative bureau (中書省, Zhongshu Sheng).  He was also given the designation Tong Zhongshu Menxia Pingzhangshi, making him a chancellor, along with Du Huangchang.  Emperor Shunzong soon passed the throne to Li Chun, who took the throne as Emperor Xianzong.  Yuan continued to serve as chancellor.

Soon thereafter, Wei Gao died, and his deputy Liu Pi seized control of the circuit that Wei governed, Xichuan Circuit (西川, headquartered in modern Chengdu, Sichuan), requesting to be allowed to succeed Wei.  Emperor Xianzong initially refused, and he sent Yuan on a mission to try to persuade Liu to submit to a new commander, as the surveyor of Xichuan and two other neighboring circuits, Dongchuan (東川, headquartered in modern Mianyang, Sichuan) and Shannan West (山南西道, headquartered in modern Hanzhong, Shaanxi).  He then made Yuan the new military governor (Jiedushi) of Xichuan Circuit and tried to summon Liu to Chang'an to serve as imperial attendant.  Liu refused and prepared to resist imperial forces.  Yuan, fearing Liu, did not dare to try to advance to Xichuan, and Emperor Xianzong, angry over Yuan's fear, demoted him to be the prefect of Ji Prefecture (吉州, in modern Ji'an, Jiangxi).

Soon thereafter, however, Yuan was repromoted to be the military governor of Yicheng Circuit (義成, headquartered in modern Anyang, Henan).  While there, the people were so appreciate of him that, although he was still alive, built a shrine dedicated to him.  He was later recalled to Chang'an to serve as the minister of census (戶部尚書, Hubu Shangshu), and later served as the military governor of Shannan East Circuit (山南東道, headquartered in modern Xiangfan, Hubei).  In 814, Emperor Xianzong swapped his post with Yan Shou the military governor of Jingnan Circuit (荊南, headquartered in modern Jingzhou).

As of 816, Emperor Xianzong was waging a campaign against Wu Yuanji, who ruled Zhangyi Circuit (彰義, headquartered in modern Zhumadian) in a de facto independent manner from the imperial government.  Yuan, whose home Cai Prefecture was Zhangyi's capital prefecture, went to see Emperor Xianzong at Chang'an in 816, intending to persuade him to end the campaign against Wu, which was not going well at the time.  On the way to Chang'an, however, he heard that the officials Xiao Mian and Qian Hui had been removed from their offices due to their opposition to the campaign, and he became fearful.  When he reached Chang'an, instead of his originally intended advice, he instead informed Emperor Xianzong that he believed that Wu could be defeated, and Emperor Xianzong allowed him to return to Jingnan.  Soon thereafter, with the commander of the forces against Wu, Gao Xiayu, having no success against Wu, Emperor Xianzong made Yuan the military governor of Zhangyi, briefly carving out three prefectures of Shannan East Circuit (Tang (唐州, in modern Zhumadian), Sui (隨州, in modern Suizhou, Hubei), and Deng (鄧州, in modern Nanyang, Henan)) to serve as his territory and headquartering the circuit at Tang Prefecture.  Once Yuan arrived at Tang Prefecture, however, he stopped all of the scouting activities and incursions into Wu's territory, and when Wu attacked his military outpost Xinxingza and put it under siege, Yuan wrote Wu in abject language requesting that he lift the siege.  Emperor Xianzong was displeased when he heard this, and he had Li Su replace Yuan around the new year 817.  Yuan was demoted to be the prefect of Fu Prefecture (撫州, in modern Fuzhou, Jiangxi), but was soon made the governor (觀察使, Guanchashi) of Hunan Circuit (湖南, headquartered in modern Changsha, Hunan).  He died in 818, while still serving at Hunan, and was given posthumous honors.

Notes and references 

 Old Book of Tang, vol. 185, part 2.
 New Book of Tang, vol. 151.
 Zizhi Tongjian, vols. 235, 236, 239.

739 births
818 deaths
Chancellors under Emperor Shunzong of Tang
Chancellors under Emperor Xianzong of Tang
Tang dynasty diplomats
Tang dynasty jiedushi of Xichuan Circuit
Tang dynasty jiedushi of Yicheng Circuit
Tang dynasty jiedushi of Jingnan Circuit
Tang dynasty jiedushi of Shannan East Circuit
Tang dynasty jiedushi of Huaixi Circuit
Tang dynasty calligraphers
Chinese travel writers
Tang dynasty writers
Political office-holders in Jiangxi
Political office-holders in Hunan
8th-century Chinese calligraphers
9th-century Chinese calligraphers